Eduardo Voltan da Silva (born 29 November 2000), known as Dudu, is a Brazilian footballer who currently plays for Vitória da Conquista.

Career statistics

Club

Notes

References

2000 births
Living people
Brazilian footballers
Brazilian expatriate footballers
Association football midfielders
UAE Pro League players
Campeonato Brasileiro Série D players
São Bernardo Futebol Clube players
Al Wahda FC players
Esporte Clube Primeiro Passo Vitória da Conquista players
Expatriate footballers in the United Arab Emirates
Brazilian expatriate sportspeople in the United Arab Emirates